Korean Arts High School is an arts high school in Hongik-dong, Seongdong District, Seoul, South Korea. 

The school was established in 1981, and provides education that includes general academic subjects, such as Korean language, English, mathematics, and social studies.

Departments
 Department of Music (Classical Major, Practical Music Major)
 Department of Art 
 Department of Theater and Film (Acting Major, Musical Major, Film Major, Directing Major)

Notable alumni

 Choi Young-jae 
 Hwang Chan-sung 
 Hyun Seung-hee 
 Jo Kwon 
 Jung Min-joo 
 Kang Ji-hyun 
 Kim Hyun-ah 
 Kim Tae-hyung of BTS 
 Min Sun-ye 
 Park Ji-min 
 Park Woo-jin 
 Seo Soo-jin 
 Seo Young-joo
 Yoon Bo-mi 
 Roh Tae-hyun
 Kim Hyun-jung

References

Art schools in South Korea
High schools in Seoul
Seongdong District
Educational institutions established in 1987
1987 establishments in South Korea